Fred Weary may refer to:

 Fred Weary (offensive lineman) (born 1977), American football guard
 Fred Weary (defensive back) (born 1974), former American football cornerback